If There's a Hell Below is the sixth studio album by Black Milk. The album was released on October 28, 2014, by Fat Beats and Computer Ugly.

Background
The album was self-produced by the artist, and features guest appearances from Blu, Bun B, Pete Rock, Gene Obey, Ab, Mel and Random Axe members Sean Price and Guilty Simpson.

Track listing
All tracks produced by Black Milk.

Charts

References

2014 albums
Black Milk albums
Fat Beats Records albums